In algebra, a λ-ring or lambda ring is a commutative ring together with some operations λn on it that behave like the exterior powers of vector spaces. Many rings considered in K-theory carry a natural λ-ring structure. λ-rings also provide a powerful formalism for studying an action of the symmetric functions on the ring of polynomials, recovering and extending many classical results.

Motivation
If V and W are finite-dimensional vector spaces over a field k, then we can form the direct sum V ⊕ W, the tensor product V ⊗ W, and the n-th exterior power of V, Λn(V). All of these are again finite-dimensional vector spaces over k. The same three operations of direct sum, tensor product and exterior power are also available when working with k-linear representations of a finite group, when working with vector bundles over some topological space, and in more general situations.

λ-rings are designed to abstract the common algebraic properties of these three operations, where we also allow for formal inverses with respect to the direct sum operation. (These formal inverses also appear in Grothendieck groups, which is why the underlying additive groups of most λ-rings are Grothendieck groups.) The addition in the ring corresponds to the direct sum, the multiplication in the ring corresponds to the tensor product, and the λ-operations to the exterior powers. For example, the isomorphism

corresponds to the formula 

valid in all λ-rings, and the isomorphism

corresponds to the formula 

valid in all λ-rings. Analogous but (much) more complicated formulas govern the higher order λ-operators.

Motivation with Vector Bundles 
If we have a short exact sequence of vector bundles over a smooth scheme then locally, for a small enough open neighborhood  we have the isomorphism

So

demonstrating the basic relation in a λ-ring, that

Definition
A λ-ring is a commutative ring R together with operations λn : R → R for every non-negative integer n. These operations are required to have the following properties valid for all x, y in R and all n, m ≥ 0:
λ0(x) = 1
λ1(x) = x
λn(1) = 0 if n ≥ 2
λn(x + y) = Σi+j=n λi(x) λj(y)
λn(xy) = Pn(λ1(x), ..., λn(x), λ1(y), ..., λn(y))
λn(λm(x)) = Pn,m(λ1(x), ..., λmn(x))

where Pn and Pn,m are certain universal polynomials with integer coefficients that describe the behavior of exterior powers on tensor products and under composition. These polynomials can be defined as follows.

Let e1, ..., emn be the elementary symmetric polynomials in the variables X1, ..., Xmn. Then Pn,m is the unique polynomial in nm variables with integer coefficients such that Pn,m(e1, ..., emn) is the coefficient of tn in the expression

  

(Such a polynomial exists, because the expression is symmetric in the Xi and the elementary symmetric polynomials generate all symmetric polynomials.)

Now let e1, ..., en be the elementary symmetric polynomials in the variables X1, ..., Xn and f1, ..., fn be the elementary symmetric polynomials in the variables Y1, ..., Yn. Then Pn is the unique polynomial in 2n variables with integer coefficients such that  is the coefficient of tn in the expression

Variations 
The λ-rings defined above are called "special λ-rings" by some authors, who use the term "λ-ring" for a more general concept where the conditions on λn(1), λn(xy) and λm(λn(x)) are dropped.

Examples

The ring Z of integers, with the binomial coefficients  as operations (which are also defined for negative x) is a λ-ring.  In fact, this is the only λ-structure on Z. This example is closely related to the case of finite-dimensional vector spaces mentioned in the Motivation section above, identifying each vector space with its dimension and remembering that .
More generally, any binomial ring becomes a λ-ring if we define the λ-operations to be the binomial coefficients, λn(x) =. In these λ-rings, all Adams operations are the identity.
The K-theory K(X) of a topological space X is a λ-ring, with the lambda operations induced by taking exterior powers of a vector bundle.
Given a group G and a base field k, the representation ring R(G) is a λ-ring; the λ-operations are induced by the exterior powers of k-linear representations of the group G.
The ring ΛZ of symmetric functions is a λ-ring. On the integer coefficients the λ-operations are defined by binomial coefficients as above, and if e1, e2, ... denote the elementary symmetric functions, we set λn(e1) = en. Using the axioms for the λ-operations, and the fact that the functions ek are algebraically independent and generate the ring ΛZ, this definition can be extended in a unique fashion so as to turn ΛZ into a λ-ring. In fact, this is the free λ-ring on one generator, the generator being e1..

Further properties and definitions 
Every λ-ring has characteristic 0 and contains the λ-ring Z as a λ-subring.

Many notions of commutative algebra can be extended to λ-rings. For example, a λ-homomorphism between λ-rings R and S  is a ring homomorphism f : R → S such that f(λn(x)) = λn(f(x)) for all x in R and all n ≥ 0. A λ-ideal in the λ-ring R is an ideal I in R such that λn(x) ϵ I for all x in R and all n ≥ 1.

If x is an element of a λ-ring and m a non-negative integer such that  λm(x) ≠ 0 and λn(x) = 0 for all n > m, we write dim(x) = m and call the element x finite-dimensional. Not all elements need to be finite-dimensional.

See also 
Chern class
Symmetric Function
K-theory
Adams operation
Plethystic exponential

References

 
Expo 0 and V of 

Ring theory
K-theory